James Leewright (born ) is an American Republican politician and member of the Oklahoma State Senate who represented the 12th district from 2016 to 2022. He was initially elected in November 2015. He previously served in the Oklahoma House of Representatives from 2014 to 2016.

In 2022 Leewright announced he was retiring from the Oklahoma Senate and was named the  president and chief executive officer of the Oklahoma Restaurant Association.

References

Living people
Republican Party Oklahoma state senators
Year of birth missing (living people)
People from Bristow, Oklahoma
21st-century American politicians